Zarakes (before 1953: Ζάρκα - Zarka) is a village in the Dystos municipality of Euboea, Greece. Its population was 707 according to the last census (2011). The village has historically been Arvanitika speaking.

The municipal department of the same name (Δημοτικό Διαμέρισμα Ζαράκων) comprises Zarakes proper, Zarakon Beach and Mahalas old village.

An ancient fortress near Zarakes has been identified with the Eretrian fort Zaretra, mentioned by Plutarch.

Attractions in Zarakes include:
 Old village of Zarakes, also known as Μαχαλάς (Mahalas)
 Old mills
 archaeological site of Zarakes near Zoodochos Pigi church
 Old church of Saint Charalampus in old village

References

External links 
 Zarakes historical & folklore website
 Web Camara of Zarakes
 Photo albums from Zarakes & south Evia
 Weather station of Zarakes

Populated places in Euboea
Arvanite settlements